A cabal is a group of people who are united in some close design, usually to promote their private views or interests in an ideology, a state, or another community, often by intrigue and usually unbeknownst to those who are outside their group. The use of this term usually carries negative connotations of political purpose, conspiracy and secrecy. It can also refer to a secret plot or a clique, or it may be used as a verb (to form a cabal or secretly conspire).

The term is frequently employed as an antisemitic dog whistle, as evidenced both by its Hebrew origin and by its evocation of centuries-old antisemitic tropes.

Etymology 

The term cabal is derived from Kabbalah (a word that has numerous spelling variations), the Jewish mystical and spiritual interpretation of the Hebrew scripture (קַבָּלָה). In Hebrew, it means "reception" or "acceptance", denoting the sod (secret) level of Jewish exegesis. In European culture (Christian Cabala, Hermetic Qabalah) it became associated with occult doctrine or a secret.

It came into English via the French cabale from the medieval Latin cabbala, and was known early in the 17th century through usages linked to Charles II and Oliver Cromwell. By the middle of the 17th century, it had developed further to mean some intrigue entered into by a small group and also referred to the group of people so involved, i.e. a semi-secret political clique.

There is a theory that the term took on its present meaning from a group of ministers formed in 1668 - the "Cabal ministry" of King Charles II of England. Members included Sir Thomas Clifford, Lord Arlington, the Duke of Buckingham, Lord Ashley and Lord Lauderdale, whose initial letters coincidentally spelled CABAL, and who were the signatories of the public Treaty of Dover that allied England to France in a prospective war against the Netherlands, and served as a cover for the Secret Treaty of Dover. The theory that the word originated as an acronym from the names of the group of ministers is a folk etymology, although the coincidence was noted at the time and could possibly have popularized its use.

Usage in the Netherlands 

In Dutch, the word kabaal, also kabale or cabale, was used during the 18th century in the same way. The Friesche Kabaal (The Frisian Cabal) denoted the Frisian pro-Orange nobility which supported the stadholderate, but also had great influence on stadtholders Willem IV and Willem V and their regents, and therefore on the matters of state in the Dutch Republic. This influence came to an end when the major Frisian nobles at the court fell out of favor. The word nowadays has the meaning of noise, uproar, racket. It was derived as such from French and mentioned for the first time in 1845.

Conspiratorial discourse
Followers of the QAnon conspiracy theory use "The Cabal" to refer to what is perceived as a secret worldwide elite organization who, according to proponents, wish to undermine democracy and freedom, and implement their own globalist agendas.

Some anti-government movements in Australia, particularly those that emerged during Canberra’s response to the pandemic, that Scott Morrison’s secret ministerial appointments were evidence of what they said was happening all along – a "secret cabal".

See also

 
 Camarilla
 Clique
 Club
 Collusion
 Cronyism
 Cult
 Elitism
 Firm 
 Gang
 Group narcissism
 Mobbing
 Nepotism
 Obscurantism
 Power behind the throne
 Social group
 The Establishment
 There Is No Cabal

References

External links 

 
 

Secret societies
Social groups